is a thermal power station operated by JERA in the Minato Ward of the city of Nagoya. Aichi Prefecture. Japan. The facility is located at the northern end of Chita Peninsula.

History
The Shin-Nagoya Thermal power Station is the only power plant located within the city limits of Nagoya, and provides much of the city's electricity for ordinary homes. Unit 1 started operation as a coal-fired power plant in 1959, and Units 2 through 6 were built by 1964, reaching a total output of 12,560 MW, making it the largest power plant in Asia at that time. All six units were converted from coal to heavy oil in 1972. Units 1 through 4 were abolished in 1992 as their equipment reach the end of is operational life, as were Units 5 and 6 in 2002. Unit 7 was completed in 1996 as an Advanced Combined Cycle system (ACC) using LNG as fuel with a  1300 deg C combustion temperature, driving six gas and six steam turbines. Unit 8 was built between 2005 and 2008 as a More Advanced Combined Cycle system (MACC) using LNG as fuel with a 1500 deg C combustion temperature, driving four gas turbines and four steam turbines.。

In April 2019, all thermal power plant operations of Chubu Electric Power were transferred to JERA, a joint venture between Chubu Electric and TEPCO Fuel & Power, Inc, a subsidiary of Tokyo Electric Power Company.

Plant details

See also 

 Energy in Japan
 List of power stations in Japan

References

External links
official home page 

1959 establishments in Japan
Energy infrastructure completed in 1959
Natural gas-fired power stations in Japan
Buildings and structures in Nagoya
Chubu Electric Power